is a Japanese anime adapting the manga of the same name by Clamp. Renamed , it was produced by Bones, directed by Hiroshi Nishikiori, and written by Ichirō Ōkouchi. Character design was by Takahiro Komori, and the music was composed by Kohei Tanaka. The series follows Misaki Suzuhara, a schoolgirl who learns to play "Angelic Layer", a game in which players fight using dolls. Misaki enters professional competitions with her doll Hikaru.

The series first premiered on TV Tokyo on April 1, 2001, and finished on September 23, 2001, with a total of 26 episodes. The opening theme is "Be My Angel" by Atsuko Enomoto, the first ending theme is "The Starry Sky" by HAL, and the second ending theme is "After the rain" by Moeko Matsushita.

Angelic Layer was originally released in Japan across nine DVD sets, the first coming out on July 25, 2001, and was then brought out as a limited edition box set on March 3, 2004. It was released in North America by ADV Films across seven DVD sets, the first released on October 14, 2003, and then in the United Kingdom on April 19, 2004. The series was then released as a complete collection in North America on September 27, 2005, and in the UK on February 9, 2009. Angelic Layer then came out as a Blu-ray collector's edition in Japan, originally scheduled for March 26, 2010, but postponed until September 24, 2010. It was then released on Blu-ray by Sentai Filmworks in North America on December 13, 2016. Anime Limited released a Blu-ray collection in the UK on September 24, 2018, which also featured a 40-page artbook.

In 2001, Angelic Layer won the "Television Award" in the 6th Animation Kobe awards.

Episode list

Home video releases

Japanese-language releases

English-language releases

Notes

References

Angelic Layer